MV Malaspina, colloquially known as the Mal, is a mainline ROPAX ferry and the original Malaspina-class vessel for the Alaska Marine Highway System. Malaspina is named after the Malaspina Glacier, which, in turn, is named after Captain Don Alessandro Malaspina, an Italian navigator and explorer who explored the northwest coast of North America in 1791. Malaspina is nearly identical to her sister ship, MV Matanuska.

Malaspina was designed by Philip F. Spaulding and Associates, constructed in 1963 at the Lockheed Shipbuilding yards in Seattle, Washington, and elongated in 1972 at the Willamette Iron and Steel Company in Portland, Oregon. As a mainline ferry, she serves the larger of the Inside Passage communities, such as Ketchikan, Petersburg, and Sitka, but her route spans the entirety of the Inside Passage, beginning runs in either Bellingham, Washington, or Prince Rupert, British Columbia, Canada, and running to the northernmost Alaskan Panhandle community of Skagway. Since the late 1990s, Malaspina has operated mostly during the summers as a "dayboat" in the upper Lynn Canal, making daily round trips between Juneau and Skagway with stops in Haines.

Malaspinas amenities include a hot-food cafeteria, a solarium, forward, aft, movie, and business lounges, 54 four-berth cabins, and 29 two-berth cabins. She formerly had a gift shop, but it was closed in 2014 as a cost-saving measure.

See also 
 Malaspina Expedition

References

External links
 Official Alaska Marine Highway System website
 MV Malaspina

Alaska Marine Highway System vessels
1963 ships
Ships built by Lockheed Shipbuilding and Construction Company